Mary Lord may refer to:
Mary Dimmick Harrison (1858–1948), born Mary Scott Lord, second wife of U.S. president Benjamin Harrison
Mary Lord (correspondent) (born c. 1954), correspondent for U.S. News & World Report
Mary Lou Lord (born 1965), indie folk musician
Mary Pillsbury Lord (1904–1978), U.S. delegate to the United Nations General Assembly
Mary Lord (painter), English landscape painter